Ruben Adán González Acosta (born 17 July 1939) is a Uruguayan football defender who played for Uruguay in the 1962 FIFA World Cup. He also played for Club Nacional de Football.

References

External links
FIFA profile

1939 births
Living people
Uruguayan footballers
Uruguayan expatriate footballers
Uruguay international footballers
Association football defenders
Club Nacional de Football players
Boca Juniors footballers
Club Atlético Vélez Sarsfield footballers
Uruguayan Primera División players
Argentine Primera División players
Expatriate footballers in Argentina
1962 FIFA World Cup players